Clearbury Down is a 13.3 hectare biological Site of Special Scientific Interest in Wiltshire, England.  It is above the village of Charlton-All-Saints in the parish of Downton, south of Salisbury.

The site was notified in 1971.

See also
Clearbury Ring

Sources
 Natural England citation sheet for the site (accessed 11 August 2006)

External links
 Natural England website (SSSI information)

Sites of Special Scientific Interest in Wiltshire
Sites of Special Scientific Interest notified in 1971